Encephalartos kisambo is a species of cycad in the family Zamiaceae. It is native to Kenya and Tanzania. It is known as the Voi cycad.

This species is distributed in the cloud forests of the steep mountain hills at the border of southern Kenya and northern Tanzania. Most grow in misty forest habitat, and some grow on drier rock cliffsides. Some subpopulations are threatened by habitat loss to charcoal production and agriculture, and the species is threatened by overcollection.

Description
Encephalartos kisambo is an arborescent species, with a stem 1.2-2 m high, erect or sometimes decombent, 45-52 cm in diameter. 

The pinnate leaves, arranged like a crown at the apex of the stem, are 240–360 cm long, silvery-green to bluish-green in color, with a 2.5–5 cm long petiole. They are formed by 89-96 pairs of oblong-lanceolate leaflets, opposite, 24–37 cm long and 29–37 mm broad, of leathery consistency, with spiny margin, inserted on the rachis with an angle of 45°.

It is a dioecious species; the male specimens usually have 1 to 5 cones, cylinder-conical, creamy-yellow in color, 49–64 cm long and 10–12.5 cm in diameter; the female ones have from 1 to 5 cones, ovoid, 42–60 cm long, 16–20 cm in diameter, of an orange-yellow color.

The seeds are ovoid, 30–39 mm long, covered with an orange-red flesh.

References

External links
Encephalartos kisambo. Tropicos.
 
 

kisambo
Plants described in 1990
Flora of Kenya
Flora of Tanzania
Taxa named by Henk Jaap Beentje